The 2006–07 Ivy League men's basketball season was the Ivy League's 53rd season of basketball. The Ivy league doesn't have a tournament to determine the league champion; Instead the team with the best record is the champion. Ibrahim Jaaber, who played for the Penn Quakers, won the Ivy League Men's Basketball Player of the Year for the second straight year.

All-Ivy Teams

NCAA Tournament

References